The Rinnegan Crucifixion Plaque (or the Athlone Crucifixion Plaque) is a late 7th or early 8th century Irish gilt-bronze crucifixion plaque sculpture found in the 19th century in the churchyard of St. John’s on the head of Lough Ree in Rinnegan County Westmeath, and near Athlone, County Roscommon. It is one of the earliest extant representations of the crucifixion in Irish art, and outside of illuminated manuscripts, a rare example of both representation and a narrative scene in early Irish Insular art.

The Rinnegan Crucifixion is the earliest of the eight such medieval Irish plaques to have survived, and at 21.0 cm x 12.5 cm is the largest, and is widely considered the finest. Its dating to the late 7th or early 8th centuries is based on the curvilinear designs, including spirals and interlace. It held at the archaeology branch of the National Museum of Ireland (NMI) in Dublin, where it is cataloged as R554.

Description
Christ wears a tubular and long sleeved tunic and is given a mask-like face reminiscent of earlier La Tène art, and is unusually without a beard. He is shown in the center facing the viewer in a (again unusually for the period) full-frontal manner. His eyes are open and his arms outstretched, and while his feet are nailed and facing downwards, his upper body and posture suggests that he is standing within, rather than hanging from, the cross. The proportions of his body are exaggerated and in a much larger scale to the other figures, while the cross is barely discernable.

Two attendant angels hover above his arms to his immediate left and right, and representations of the Roman soldiers Stephaton (the sponge-bearer) and Longinus (the lance-bearer) at his feet. The figures were achieved by hammering the bronze from behind, while the detail was added via engraving and repoussé. The band above Christ's head contains ribbon interlace, and as on his breast-plate, is decorated with interlocking c-shaped scrolls and spirals.

The unadorned reverse and many rivet or nail-holes on the outer borders indicate that it was built as an attachment to a larger metal or wooden object. Thus most art historians conclude that it likely had a secondary function, but it is unknown as to what the precise intention was; likely such plaques adorned book covers, stone altar frontals or wooden crosses. The art historian Peter Harbison, who in 1980 first described the surviving crucifixion plaques as a group, favors pax-plates, noting that many show wear around Christ's head, indicating that they may have been passed around to be kissed during masses. In addition, Harbison suggested that the plaques were produced by a single workshop or region, a theory refuted in 2014 by Griffin Murray who points out both their geographical dispersion and provenance (although all seem to have been produced in Southern Ulster) and differences when analysed under X-ray fluorescence.

The overall design of the object has been compared to very similar crucifixion folio (f.38v) of the ninth-century Southampton Psalter and to an 11th or 12th century open-work brass plaque crucifixion plaque in the British Museum.

Dating and condition

The ecclesiastical site at Rinnegan dates back to antiquity, and the plaque was discovered alongside an iron and bronze hand-bell. Nothing is known of the circumstances around its commission or production. It is usually dated to the early 8th century based on the interlocking peltae and spiral designs on both Christ's breast-plate and on the band above his head. The historian Frank Mitchell suggests that the absence of typical insular zoomorphic animal designs suggest that it was created in the later 7th century.

It has suffered considerable damage, and would have been far more decorative when first produced. The shine on the copper is somewhat blunted, while much of the gilt has been lost, as is most of Christ's right arm The tunic at one time was lined with interlace and fretwork.

The next best known crucifixion plaque was found in Clonmacnoise, is dated to the late 11th or early 12th centuries, and is also in the NMI.

References

Sources 

 Harbison, Peter. "The Bronze Crucifixion Plaque said to be from St John's (Rinnegan), near Athlone". ̄Journal of Irish Archaeology II, 1984
 Harbison, Peter. "A lost crucifixion plaque of Clonmacnoise type found in County Mayo". ̄Irish Midland Studies: essays in commemoration of N.W. English, Athlone, 1980
 Johnson, Ruth. "Irish Crucifixion Plaques: Viking Age or Romanesque?". The Journal of the Royal Society of Antiquaries of Ireland, volume 128, 1998. 
 Mitchell, Frank. "Foregin Influence and the Beginnings of Christian Art". In: Treasures of early Irish art, 1500 B.C. to 1500 A.D: From the collections of the National Museum of Ireland, Royal Irish Academy, Trinity College Dublin. NY: Metropolitan Museum of Art, 1977. 
 MacDermott, Máire. "An Openwork Crucifixion Plaque from Clonmacnoise". The Journal of the Royal Society of Antiquaries of Ireland, volume 84, no. 1, 1954.  
 Moss, Rachel. Medieval c. 400—c. 1600: Art and Architecture of Ireland. New Haven (CT): Yale University Press, 2014. 
 Murray, Griffin. "Irish crucifixion plaques: a reassessment. In: Mullins, Juliet; Ni Ghradaigh, Jenifer (eds): Envisioning Christ on the Cross: Ireland and the Early Medieval West. University of Notre Dame: Thomas F.X. Noble, 2014
 Ó Floinn, Raghnal; Wallace, Patrick (eds). Treasures of the National Museum of Ireland: Irish Antiquities.  Dublin: National Museum of Ireland, 2002. 
 O'Toole, Fintan.  A History of Ireland in 100 Objects. Dublin: Royal Irish Academy, 2013.

Further reading
 Kelly, Dorothy. "Crucifivion Plaques". Irish Arts Review Yearbook, 1990

Collection of the National Museum of Ireland
Crucifixion plaques